Radha Krishna or Kalanka Bhanjan is a Bengali religious film directed by Priyanath Ganguly and Tulsi Lahiri. This film was released in 1933 in the banner of Bharat Laxmi Film Company.

Plot
This film is based on Indian Mythological love story of Radha and Krishna.

Cast
 Shreemati Lakshmi as Krishna
 Bimal Dasgupta as Ayaan Ghosh
 Shreemati Suhasini as Yashoda
 Duniyabala as Radha
 Manindra Bose as Nanda
 Amar Choudhary as Gokul
 Shreemati Niradasundari as Jatila
 Kshirodgopal Mukherjee as Narada
 Shreemati Saraswati as Kutila

References

External links

1933 films
Indian black-and-white films
Films about Hinduism
Hindu devotional films
Religious epic films
Hindu mythological films
Films about Krishna